The 2017 Liga 3 Banten is the third edition of Liga 3 Banten as a qualifying round for the national round of 2017 Liga 3. 

The competition scheduled starts on July 21, 2017.

All match will played at Maulana Yusuf Stadium.

Teams
There are 6 clubs which will participate the league in this season.

References

2017 in Indonesian football